Micklegate is a street in the City of York, England. The name means "Great Street", "gate" coming from the Old Norse gata, or street.

Micklegate is described by York City Council as "one of the most handsome streets in Yorkshire", and was described by Nikolaus Pevsner as "...without any doubt the most architecturally rewarding street in York".  There are three Medieval churches on the street, and a total of four Grade I listed buildings, with the majority of buildings being three- or four-storey Georgian structures.

The name Micklegate is sometimes applied to a slightly broader area, including the side streets Toft Green, Priory Street, Trinity Lane and St Martin's Lane.  There is also a ward of Micklegate, used for elections to the City Council, which covers a much larger area, spreading well beyond the city walls.

Geography
The street runs east from the York city walls at Micklegate Bar, long the main southern entrance to the city, continuing the route of Blossom Street.  On its north side, it has junctions with Bar Lane, Barker Lane and George Hudson Street; and on the south side, with Priory Street, Trinity Lane, and St Martin's Lane.

Micklegate ends at the junction of North Street and Skeldergate.  The continuation of the road in this direction is the short Bridge Street, which then crosses the River Ouse as Ouse Bridge.  The street winds down a gentle slope towards the Ouse, and the council describes this, along with the number and density of historic buildings on the street, as defining its character.  Due to its historic importance, and with Micklegate Bar regarded as the royal entrance to the city, it is relatively wide, compared to many streets in the city centre.  Micklegate is also known for the attractive views along the street, particularly at the top and bottom ends.

History
The road originated as part of a Roman road from Tadcaster to York, which ran through a civilian settlement in the Micklegate and Bishophill area, in the direction of the fortress on the other bank of the Ouse.  Its alignment was altered in the Viking period, when the Ouse was bridged in a new location, and it has remained unaltered since.  By this time, it was known as Great Street - "Myglagata" - which evolved to become "Micklegate".

During the Medieval era, long burgage plots with narrow street frontages were allocated, and these still form the basis for some building plots.  By 1282, there were at least 118 built-up "tofts" on the street, and this has been taken as evidence that its entire length had been built up.  In 1586, William Camden described the street in Brittanica: "One gate named Micklegate Barre, the great gate from which a long and broad street reacheth to the bridge.  The same street is beset with proper houses having gardens and orchards planted on either hand and behind them fields".

The street always had a mixed character, with houses of wealthy citizens of York, town houses of minor nobility from elsewhere in the county, smaller houses, shops and inns.  The Butter Market, which was located in front of St Martin's Church, was the staple - setting the prices - for the entire north of England, although it went into decline and was demolished early in the 19th-century.

The Georgian period saw many wealthy citizens of the region build large houses on the street, particularly its middle and upper sections, while many other properties were given new facades, in contemporary styles.

The street remained the main access to the city from the south until the modern era.  However, since the Victorian period, the street has been a less prestigious address, and the back gardens of many houses were built over and used for industry.  George Hudson Street was created in 1877, linking Micklegate with York railway station, and this now forms the main southern for traffic into York city centre, along with the eastern stretch of Micklegate, the remainder of the street seeing relatively little traffic.

114 Micklegate was the birthplace of the architect J. A. Hansom, who invented the hansom cab.

Notable buildings

Micklegate Bar
The lower section of Micklegate Bar was built in the 12th century, and the top stories in the 14th. At least six reigning monarchs passed through this gate.  A restoration of the Bar was completed in late 2017.

Following the Battle of Wakefield, a battle during the Wars of the Roses, the heads of Richard Plantagenet, 3rd Duke of York (father of Edward IV and Richard III), Edmund, Earl of Rutland (another son of Richard) and Richard Neville, 5th Earl of Salisbury were displayed on Micklegate Bar.

Micklegate Bar once had a barbican or outer gateway in front of it, which became ruinous and was demolished in 1826. The two doorways to the top of the barbican can be seen in the photo above right.

The City Walls Experience at Micklegate Bar (formerly known as the Henry VII Experience), is located in the southern gatehouse.

Micklegate Bar to Trinity Lane
Notable buildings on the north side of the street include 142–146 Micklegate, with 17th-century origins; 138 Micklegate, also 17th-century; 134 and 136 Micklegate, built in 1740; 128–132 Micklegate, built in the 1750s; 122–126 Micklegate, partly dating from the 17th-century; 118 and 120 Micklegate, built in about 1742; 114 Micklegate, constructed in the later 17th-century; the 16th-century 112 Micklegate, internally timber-framed and formerly the Red Lion; the heavily altered early-18th century 110 Micklegate; the late-17th century 102 and 104 Micklegate; The Nag's Head, built about 1530 and with earlier origins; 98 Micklegate, built in the 1770s; The Falcon Tap, an ancient inn with no part of its early buildings surviving, but an 18th-century sign; 92 Micklegate, built about 1798; Micklegate House, is the largest house on the street, a Grade I listed building, and the early-18th century Bathurst House.

On the south side lie the 14th-century pub The Priory; the timber-framed 16th-century 95 Micklegate; 85–89 Micklegate, built about 1500; the 18th-century 83 Micklegate; the Holy Trinity Church, a Grade I listed parish church, the only remaining part of Micklegate Priory; and 77 Micklegate, built about 1790.

Trinity Lane to George Hudson Street

On the north side of the street lie 74 and 76 Micklegate, dating from the mid-18th century; 70 and 72 Micklegate, with 15th-century origins; mid-17th century 68 Micklegate; late-18th century 58 and 60 Micklegate; 56 Micklegate, of 17th-century origin; Garforth House, built in 1757; 42–48 Micklegate, originating in 1710; and the former Adelphi Hotel, largely rebuilt in the mid-19th century, but with some earlier material.

On the south side are 73 and 75 Micklegate, built in 1730; 69 and 71 Micklegate, originating about 1700, and 67 Micklegate, of similar date; late-18th century 61 Micklegate; 57 and 59 Micklegate, built in 1783; 53 and 55 Micklegate, completed about 1755; and St Martin-cum-Gregory, a Grade I listed church, currently used as a stained glass centre.

George Hudson Street to Bridge Street

St John's Church, on the north side of the street, is a Grade II* listed building.  After a period as the York Arts Centre, it is currently used as a bar.

On the south side of the street are 33–37 Micklegate, with a 17th-century wing; Cromwell House, reconstructed in 1860 but with older elements; Crown House, long an inn, with a 17th-century section; 19 and 21 Micklegate, of 15th-century origin; and 11 and 13 Micklegate, built about 1740.

Contemporary use

The street became famous for its pubs and clubs, being known as "The Micklegate Run" by many drinkers and club-goers in the late 20th century.

Writing in 2011, Avril Webster described Micklegate as remaining a "nice shopping area", with a "good selection of specialist shops".  However, according to York City Council, although pedestrian use of the street is high, many businesses on the street have struggled in recent years.

Sources

References

External links 

Micklegate website and general history of the street as well as Micklegate Bar.